Delfland may refer to the following entities in South Holland, the Netherlands
Midden-Delfland, a municipality
Hoogheemraadschap van Delfland, a water board